Hera (minor planet designation: 103 Hera) is a moderately large main-belt asteroid with an orbital period of . It was discovered by Canadian-American astronomer James Craig Watson on September 7, 1868, and named after Hera, queen and fifth in power of the Olympian gods in Greek mythology. This is a stony S-type asteroid with a silicate surface composition.

The bimodal light curve shows a maximum brightness variation of 0.45 ± 0.03 in magnitude.

References

External links 
 
 

000103
Discoveries by James Craig Watson
Named minor planets
000103
000103
18680907